Mount Nirvana, at  is the unofficial name of the highest mountain in the Northwest Territories, Canada. Currently the Canadian government is working to officially recognize the name Thunder Mountain, reflecting the local Dehcho First Nation name for the mountain. Today, the name Mt. Nirvana is commonly depicted in alpine literature.

Mount Nirvana is part of Nahanni National Park Reserve, the largest national park in the Northwest Territories.

History
Part of the Mackenzie Mountains, it was first climbed by Bill Buckingham and Lew Surdam in July 1965. Buckingham gave the mountain the moniker of "Mount Nirvana" at that time.

See also
 List of highest points of Canadian provinces and territories
 Mountain peaks of Canada
 List of mountain peaks of North America

References

External links
 "Mount Nirvana, Northwest Territories" on Peakbagger

Two-thousanders of the Northwest Territories
Nahanni National Park Reserve